The Christian Party (KP) was a centre-right political party in Lithuania. The Christian Party was founded on 23 January 2010 as a merger of the Christian Conservative Social Union (Krikščionių konservatorių socialinė sąjunga) and the Lithuanian Party of Christian Democracy (Lietuvos krikščioniškosios demokratijos partija).

The party has eight members in the Seimas. The leader, Vidmantas Žiemelis was elected for the Homeland Union – Lithuanian Christian Democrats, Jonas Ramonas for Order and Justice, and eight were elected for the National Resurrection Party: Ligitas Kernagis, Vytautas Kurpuvesas, Aleksandr Sacharuk, Jonas Stanevičius, Donalda Meiželytė Svilienė, Zita Užlytė, Mantas Varaška, and Rokas Žilinskas. However, Varaška and Žilinskas defected to the group of the Homeland Union in Spring 2011.

References

External links
  Christian Party official website
 Seimas faction webpage

Christian democratic parties in Europe
Political parties established in 2010
2010 establishments in Lithuania
Conservative parties in Lithuania